Events in the year 2008 in Argentina.

Incumbents
President: Cristina Fernández de Kirchner 
Vice President: Julio Cobos

Governors
Governor of Buenos Aires Province: Daniel Scioli 
Governor of Catamarca Province: Eduardo Brizuela del Moral 
Governor of Chaco Province: Jorge Capitanich 
Governor of Chubut Province: Mario Das Neves 
Governor of Córdoba: Juan Schiaretti 
Governor of Corrientes Province: Arturo Colombi 
Governor of Entre Ríos Province: Sergio Urribarri 
Governor of Formosa Province: Gildo Insfrán
Governor of Jujuy Province: Walter Barrionuevo 
Governor of La Pampa Province: Óscar Jorge 
Governor of La Rioja Province: Luis Beder Herrera 
Governor of Mendoza Province: Francisco Pérez 
Governor of Misiones Province: Maurice Closs 
Governor of Neuquén Province: Jorge Sapag 
Governor of Río Negro Province: Miguel Saiz 
Governor of Salta Province: Juan Manuel Urtubey 
Governor of San Juan Province: José Luis Gioja 
Governor of San Luis Province: Alberto Rodríguez Saá
Governor of Santa Cruz Province: Daniel Peralta 
Governor of Santa Fe Province: Hermes Binner 
Governor of Santiago del Estero: Gerardo Zamora
Governor of Tierra del Fuego: Fabiana Ríos 
Governor of Tucumán: José Alperovich

Vice Governors
Vice Governor of Buenos Aires Province: Alberto Balestrini 
Vice Governor of Catamarca Province: Marta Grimaux 
Vice Governor of Chaco Province: Juan Carlos Bacileff Ivanoff 
Vice Governor of Corrientes Province: Tomás Rubén Pruyas 
Vice Governor of Entre Rios Province: José Lauritto 
Vice Governor of Formosa Province: Floro Bogado 
Vice Governor of Jujuy Province: Pedro Segura 
Vice Governor of La Pampa Province: Luis Alberto Campo 
Vice Governor of La Rioja Province: Teresita Luna 
Vice Governor of Misiones Province: Sandra Giménez 
Vice Governor of Neuquén Province: Ana Pechen 
Vice Governor of Rio Negro Province: Bautista Mendioroz 
Vice Governor of Salta Province: Andrés Zottos 
Vice Governor of San Juan Province: Rubén Uñac 
Vice Governor of San Luis Province: Jorge Luis Pellegrini 
Vice Governor of Santa Cruz: Luis Martínez Crespo 
Vice Governor of Santa Fe Province: Griselda Tessio 
Vice Governor of Santiago del Estero: Ángel Niccolai 
Vice Governor of Tierra del Fuego: Carlos Basanetti

Events

January
 12/13 January: Passengers protest at Ezeiza International Airport against delays by Aerolíneas Argentinas.

February
 Heavy rain and floods force thousands of people from their homes in Buenos Aires Province.

March
 9 March: Seventeen people are killed and 47 injured after a passenger train crashes into a bus in the town of Dolores in eastern Argentina. 
 12 March: The agricultural sector starts a 20-day lock-out in protest at the increase in export taxes on soybeans and sunflower.

April
 11 April: The 2008 Olympic Torch Relay passes through Buenos Aires for the first time, largely without incident.
 17 April: Buenos Aires is covered in a thick cloud of smoke, closing roads and airports. The smoke is blamed on farmers burning their fields.
 23 April: Poet Juan Gelman receives the Cervantes Prize, the Spanish-speaking world's highest literary honour.
 24 April: Economy minister Martín Lousteau resigns following rumours of disagreements with other ministers. He is replaced with Carlos Fernández.
 24 April: Football hero Diego Maradona is welcomed into membership of the Justicialist Party.

May
 2 May: The eruption of the Chaitén volcano in Chile covers much of Argentina in ash, particularly the city of Esquel, and forces the cancellation of flights from Buenos Aires.
 17 May: Dissident ARI legislators create a new political party, Solidarity and Equality (Solidaridad e Igualdad Sí, or simply Sí).

June
 25 June: Argentina reports that its total foreign debt hit US$127 billion in the first quarter of the year — continuing to rise higher than when the country negotiated a record debt swap in 2005. The increase in combined public and private debt was driven by private companies borrowing money abroad to finance operations. Debt was US$123 billion at the end of 2007.International Herald Tribune

July

 2 July: Lost scenes from German-Austrian director Fritz Lang's legendary silent film "Metropolis" are discovered in Argentina. Paula Félix-Didier, head of film museum Museo del Cine in Buenos Aires, discovered an uncut version of the 1927 science fiction film when she looked into reports that a tape in the archive was unusually long. She travelled to Berlin with a copy of the film and met with experts who say they are certain it is the missing original-length version of Lang's masterpiece that reveals key plot scenes and an expansion of minor roles, Die Zeit said.The Local
 10 July: When the Teatro Colón, Latin America's most famous opera house, closed for refurbishment in November 2006, Buenos Aires city officials vowed that it would reopen in time for its centenary on May 25, 2008. But when the great day arrived, the theatre's golden proscenium arch was still in pieces on the floor, alongside plywood boards, while scaffolding rose the full  height of its dome. To kick off the celebrations, the Colón's resident symphony orchestra was obliged to perform in a neighbouring theatre specialising in musicals, where it had to use microphones instead of relying on the opera house's fabulous natural acoustics.Economist.com
 19 July: After months of standoff with irate farmers, and a humiliating defeat in the Senate, the government rolls back the extra levy on farm exports. The government rescinded Friday a controversial tax increase on grain exports that had sparked months of protests and bared deep divisions in one of the world's major food-producing nations.Los Angeles Times
23 July: Argentina replaces cabinet chief: Argentine President Cristina Fernandez names former head of the social security agency Sergio Massa as cabinet chief, in a shake-up just days after the Senate rejected a government tax hike on soy exports.Reuters

August
12 August: Argentina's government announces a plan to buy back some of the country's debt, triggering a recovery in financial assets following the previous week's selloff. While news of the intervention props up markets, economists remain broadly pessimistic about President Cristina Kirchner's populist economic policies, which have stoked inflation, eroded Argentina's fiscal position and alienated the agribusiness sector that is the motor of the economy. That pessimism was reflected in a move by the ratings agency Standard & Poor's Corp. to lower Argentina's foreign and local currency long-term credit ratings to B from B+.Wall Street Journal
13 August: The Argentine Senate passes a law that defines alimentary disorders such as obesity, anorexia and bulimia, as diseases, and therefore medical insurers have to take care of the cost of their treatment Yahoo news, Diario Clarín.
9-24 August: At the 2008 Summer Olympics in Beijing, Argentina wins gold medals in the Madison cycling and men's football and bronze medals in judo, sailing, and women's hockey.

Predicted and scheduled events

September

October

November

December

Deaths
9 January, Jorge Anaya, Admiral
3 February, Jorge Liderman, composer
4 February, Bertha Moss, actress
12 March, Jorge Guinzburg, journalist
18 May, Irma Córdoba, actress
25 May, Ítalo Argentino Lúder, politician
31 May, Nelly Láinez, actress
9 June, Esteban Mellino, actor
27 July: Osvaldo Álvarez Guerrero, politician
August 2: Pérez Celis, plastic artist
August 15: Carlos Meglia, comic book artist, co-creator of Cybersix

Sports
See worldwide 2008 in sports
 13 April: Argentina's male tennis team qualifies for the Davis Cup semi-finals against Russia with victory against Sweden.
 24 June: The Dakar 2009 is off to discover a new continent, South America that offers unlimited possibilities to amateurs of wide open spaces. The round trip to Buenos Aires, via Valparaíso is a challenge in which the most enduring competitors will find their way and have the opportunity to distinguish themselves.
 19 August: Juan Esteban Curuchet and Walter Fernando Perez wins the Olympic gold medal in the Madison cycling event, the first Olympic gold in cycling for Argentina, and also the country's first gold medal in the 2008 Summer Olympics. UPI.com
 23 August: The Argentina national football team wins gold for the second consecutive time at the 2008 Summer Olympics, with Javier Mascherano becoming the first Argentine Olympian to win two gold medals.

See also
List of Argentine films of 2008

References

 
Years of the 21st century in Argentina